The band-tailed manakin (Pipra fasciicauda) is a species of bird in the family Pipridae. It is found in Argentina, Bolivia, Brazil, Paraguay, and Peru. Its natural habitats are subtropical or tropical moist lowland forest, subtropical or tropical swamps, and heavily degraded former forest. It forms a superspecies with both the crimson-hooded manakin (Pipra aureola) and the wire-tailed manakin (Pipra filicauda).

References

band-tailed manakin
Birds of the Amazon Basin
Birds of the Peruvian Amazon
Birds of the Bolivian Amazon
Birds of the Pantanal
Birds of Paraguay
band-tailed manakin
band-tailed manakin
Taxonomy articles created by Polbot